Antonio Thomas may refer to:

 Antonio Thomas (cricketer) (born 1982), Barbadian cricketer
 Antonio Thomas (wrestler), stage name of professional wrestler Tom Matera
 J. Antonio Thomas, Canadian politician
 Antonio Thomás, 16th-century Portuguese marine and conquistador

See also
Tony Thomas (disambiguation)